Edward F. Edinger (December 13, 1922, in Cedar Rapids, Iowa – July 17, 1998, in Los Angeles, California) was a medical psychiatrist, Jungian analyst and American writer.

Life and career
Edward F. Edinger Jr. was born on December 13, 1922 in Cedar Rapids, Iowa, earning his Bachelor of Arts in chemistry at Indiana University and his Doctor of Medicine at Yale School of Medicine in 1946. In November 1947, as a first lieutenant, he started a four week Medical Field Service School at the Brooke Army Medical Center, Fort Sam Houston, Texas. He became a military doctor in the United States Army Medical Corps and was in Panama. In New York in 1951, he began his analysis with Mary Esther Harding, who had been associated with C. G. Jung.

Edinger was a psychiatrist supervisor at Rockland State Hospital in Orangeburg, New York, and later founder member of the C.G. Jung Foundation in Manhattan and the CG Jung Institute in New York. He was president of the institute from 1968 until 1979, when he moved to Los Angeles. There he continued his practice for 19 years, becoming senior analyst at the CG Jung Institute of Los Angeles.

He died on July 17, 1998 at his home in Los Angeles at age 75, according to family members due to bladder cancer.

List of works
Ego and Archetype: Individuation and the Religious Function of the Psyche
Anatomy of the Psyche: Alchemical Symbolism in Psychotherapy
The Creation of Consciousness: Jung's Myth for Modern Man
Encounter With the Self: A Jungian Commentary on William Blake's Illustrations of the Book of Job
The Bible and the Psyche: Individuation Symbolism in the Old Testament
The Christian Archetype: A Jungian Commentary on the Life of Christ
Living Psyche: A Jungian Analysis in Psychotherapy Pictures
Goethe's Faust: Notes for a Jungian Commentary
Transformation of Libido: A Seminar on CG Jung's Symbols of Transformation
Transformation of the God-Image: An Elucidation of Jung's Answer to Job
The Mystery of the Coniunctio: Alchemical Image of Individuation
The Mysterium Lectures: A Journey through CG Jung's Mysterium Coniunctionis
Melville's Moby-Dick: A Jungian Commentary. An American Nekyia
The New God-Image: A Study of Jung's Key Letters Concerning the Evolution of the Western God-Image
The Aion Lectures: Exploring the Self in CG Jung's Aion
The Psyche in Antiquity: Early Greek Philosophy: From Thales to Plotinus
The Psyche in Antiquity: Gnosticism and Early Christianity: From Paul of Tarsus to Augustine
Ego and Self: The Old Testament Prophets. From Isaiah to Malachi
Eternal Drama: The Inner Meaning of Greek Mythology
The Psyche on Stage: Individuation Motifs in Shakespeare and Sophocles
Archetype of the Apocalypse: Divine Vengeance, Terrorism, and the End of the World
Science of the Soul: A Jungian Perspective
The Sacred Psyche: A Psychological Approach to the Psalms
An American Jungian: In Honor of Edward F. Edinger

References

External links
Edward F. Edinger, 75, Analyst And Writer on Jung's Concepts
IN MEMORIAM: Edward F. Edinger, 1922-1998. A Personal Tribute by Daryl Sharp

1922 births
1998 deaths
American male writers
American psychiatrists
Jungian psychologists
Indiana University alumni
Yale School of Medicine alumni
Deaths from bladder cancer
Deaths from cancer in California
United States Army Medical Corps officers
American expatriates in Panama